Wu Mei-ling (born 6 January 1973) is a Taiwanese judoka. She competed at the 1992 Summer Olympics and the 1996 Summer Olympics.

References

1973 births
Living people
Taiwanese female judoka
Olympic judoka of Taiwan
Judoka at the 1992 Summer Olympics
Judoka at the 1996 Summer Olympics
Place of birth missing (living people)
Judoka at the 1994 Asian Games
Judoka at the 1998 Asian Games
Asian Games medalists in judo
Asian Games bronze medalists for Chinese Taipei
Medalists at the 1994 Asian Games
Medalists at the 1998 Asian Games
Universiade bronze medalists for Chinese Taipei
Universiade medalists in judo
20th-century Taiwanese women